Plewki  is a village in the administrative district of Gmina Szepietowo, within Wysokie Mazowieckie County, Podlaskie Voivodeship, in north-eastern Poland.

The village has a population of 70.

References

Plewki